The selection process for the 1992 Winter Olympics consisted of seven bids, and saw Albertville, France, be selected ahead of Sofia, Bulgaria; Falun, Sweden; Lillehammer, Norway; Cortina d'Ampezzo, Italy; Anchorage, Alaska, United States; and Berchtesgaden, West Germany. The selection was made at the 91st IOC Session in Lausanne, Switzerland, on 16 October 1986.

Results

References

Bids
 
October 1986 events in Europe
20th century in Lausanne
Events in Lausanne